Park Place Tower is located at 655 West Irving Park Road, Chicago, Illinois and is a 56-story, 901-unit condominium tower located in the Lakeview neighborhood in the north side of Chicago. Park Place Tower is the tallest building in Chicago outside of downtown.

Construction and renovation
The tower was initially built in 1971. The entire building was completely renovated and converted to a condominium building in a multi-million dollar project that lasted from 2001 until 2006.

Design awards
The Tower's redesign has earned many awards, including:
 The Interior Design Institute of British Columbia's Best in Show for 2002
 The Interior Design Institute of British Columbia's Gold Medal Award of Excellence for 2002
 The Home Builders Association of Greater Chicago's Silver "Key Award" - Best Overall Community, Urban for 2002
 The Home Builders Association of Greater Chicago's Silver "Key Award" - Clubhouse/Club Center, Urban for 2002
 The Home Builders Association of Greater Chicago's Silver "Key Award" - Lobbies for 2002

See also
List of tallest buildings in Chicago

References

External links
Park Place Developer Web Site
Park Place Official Web Site

Residential condominiums in Chicago
Residential skyscrapers in Chicago
Residential buildings completed in 1971
1971 establishments in Illinois